Hans Miller (9 April 1890 Väike-Konguta Parish, Tartu County – 3 April 1952 Stockholm) was an Estonian politician. He was a member of IV Riigikogu. On 2 September 1930, he resigned his position and he was replaced by August Salum.

References

1890 births
1952 deaths
Members of the Riigikogu, 1929–1932
Estonian World War II refugees
Estonian emigrants to Sweden
People from Elva Parish